KBBN-FM (95.3 FM) is a radio station broadcasting a classic rock format. Licensed to Broken Bow, Nebraska, United States, the station is currently owned by Custer County Broadcasting Co. and features programming from Westwood One and NBC Radio.

References

External links

BBN-FM
Classic rock radio stations in the United States
Radio stations established in 1971